The Access 2.3 is a single-crew cat rigged sailing keelboat, which is recognised by the International Sailing Federation as an international class. It is typically regarded as being a beginner's dinghy.

Background

Performance and design
The Access 2.3 differs from the majority of dinghies in that is controlled by a joystick, rather than a tiller, and the single crew is seated facing forwards. The crew does not switch sides during a tack and the boom is rigged high so as to avoid the helm's head during a tack.

The boat is generally regarded as being a good beginner's boat for someone new to sailing, due to its stability and the ease with which it can be sailed.

Because the boat can be equipped with servo assist electric controls it is possible for those with physical disabilities to sail it by themselves.

Access 2.3 wide
There is also a wide version of the Access 2.3 which can accommodate for two average sized adults, although it is still capable of being sailed by a single crew.

Events

World Championships

References

External links
The Access 2.3 at the class homepage
ISAF Access 2.3 Microsite

See also
Access 303
Access Liberty (keelboat)
SKUD 18

Dinghies
Keelboats
Access 2.3